Tsk or TSK may refer to:

 "tsk!", a dental click
 Tsk Tsk Tsk, an Australian music, art and performance group
 Galoter process, shale oil extraction technology
 San-in Chūō Television Broadcasting, a Japanese TV station
 Takagi-Sugeno-Kang, a system of Fuzzy logic
 Terrace step kink, a model to describe the thermodynamics of crystal surface formation
 The Sleuth Kit, computer forensics tools
 Tiger Schulmann's Karate
 Tomsk Avia (ICAO: TSK), a Russian airline
 Transmission security keys
 Tseku language (ISO 639:tsk), a language of Tibet
 Turkish Armed Forces (Turkish: Türk Silahlı Kuvvetleri)